is a retired female long-distance runner from Japan, who won the 1992 edition of Nagoya Marathon on March 1, 1992, clocking a total time of 2:31:04.

Achievements

References
ARRS

1969 births
Living people
Place of birth missing (living people)
Japanese female long-distance runners
Japanese female marathon runners
Japan Championships in Athletics winners
20th-century Japanese women
21st-century Japanese women